|}

The Ascot Chase is a Grade 1 National Hunt steeplechase in Great Britain which is open to horses aged five years or older. It is run at Ascot over a distance of about 2 miles and 5 furlongs (2 miles, 5 furlongs and 85 yards, or ), and during its running there are seventeen fences to be jumped. The race is scheduled to take place each year in February.

The event was first run in 1995, as the Comet Chase, and its distance was originally set at 2 miles and 3½ furlongs (3,923 metres). This was modified slightly when the race was temporarily switched to Lingfield Park, and also upon its return to Ascot in 2007. The present length was introduced in 2008.

The race was run on a Wednesday until 1998, moving to its current Saturday in 1999.  It replaced the Whitbread Trial Handicap (3 miles 100 yards) on the Wednesday card, a race which was first run in 1966.

Records
Most successful horse (2 wins):
 Tiutchev – 2001, 2003
 Monet's Garden – 2007, 2010
 Riverside Theatre – 2011, 2012
 Cue Card – 2013, 2017

Leading jockey (3 wins):
 Barry Geraghty – Monet's Garden (2010), Riverside Theatre (2011, 2012)

Leading trainer (4 wins):
 Martin Pipe – Tresor de Mai (2002), Tiutchev (2003), Our Vic (2006), It Takes Time (2005)
 Paul Nicholls -  Rockforce (2000), Kauto Star (2008), Silviniaco Conti (2016), Cyrname (2019) 
 Nicky Henderson - Tiutchev (2001), Riverside Theatre (2011,2012), Shishkin (2023)

Winners

See also
 Horse racing in Great Britain
 List of British National Hunt races

References
 Racing Post:

 pedigreequery.com – Ascot Chase – Ascot.

External links
 Race Recordings 

National Hunt races in Great Britain
Ascot Racecourse
National Hunt chases
Recurring sporting events established in 1995
1995 establishments in England